Julius Honka (born 3 December 1995) is a Finnish professional ice hockey defenceman for Luleå HF of the Swedish Hockey League (SHL). Honka was selected by the Dallas Stars in the first round (14th overall) of the 2014 NHL Entry Draft.

Playing career
Honka was a top rated prospect who was ranked #11 on the NHL Central Scouting Bureau final list of 2014 NHL Draft eligible North American skaters.
 
During the 2012–13 season Honka played with the Finland men's national under-18 ice hockey team at both the 2013 IIHF World U18 Championships and the 2013 Ivan Hlinka Memorial Tournament. Moving to North America for the 2013–14 WHL season, he competed with Team Finland to win gold at the 2014 World Junior Ice Hockey Championships and was also selected to compete in the 2014 CHL/NHL Top Prospects Game.
 
On 14 July 2014, Honka was signed to a three-year entry level contract with the Dallas Stars. During the 2016–17 season, Honka scored his first career goal on 4 April 2017, a game winning overtime goal in a game against the Arizona Coyotes.
 
In the following 2017–18 season, Honka was sent down to the Stars AHL affiliate, the Texas Stars, on 31 October 2017. He was later recalled and remained with Dallas to appear in a career high 42 games.

Unable to cement a role at the NHL level within the Stars' blueline, Honka as a pending restricted free agent formally requested a trade from the Stars in September 2019. Unable to facilitate a satisfactory trade during the off-season, on 10 October 2019, Honka signed a contract with his original Finnish club, JYP Jyväskylä of the Liiga. As a restricted free agent, the Dallas Stars would retain his rights. In the 2019–20 season, making his top level Liiga debut, Honka contributed with 4 goals and 15 points through 46 regular season games before the post-season was cancelled due to the COVID-19 pandemic.
 
On 30 October 2020, Honka returned to the Dallas Stars organization after he was signed to a one-year, two-way contract worth $700,000 at the NHL level and $90,000 at the AHL level. Honka was placed on waivers by the Stars on 20 January 2021. After going unclaimed Honka was reassigned by Dallas to Texas appearing in 17 games at the AHL level.

Unable to further his NHL career, Honka returned to Europe and signed a two-year contract with Swedish club, Luleå HF of the SHL, on 26 May 2021.

Personal life
Honka comes from a family of hockey players; his three brothers also play the same sport. His younger brother Anttoni was drafted in the third round (83rd overall) by the Carolina Hurricanes in the 2019 NHL Entry Draft and currently plays for JYP Jyväskylä of Finland's Liiga.

Career statistics

Regular season and playoffs

International

Awards and honours

References

External links
 

1995 births
Living people
Dallas Stars draft picks
Dallas Stars players
Finnish expatriate ice hockey players in Canada
Finnish expatriate ice hockey players in Sweden
Finnish expatriate ice hockey players in the United States
Finnish ice hockey defencemen
JYP Jyväskylä players
Lahti Pelicans players
Luleå HF players
National Hockey League first-round draft picks
Sportspeople from Jyväskylä
Swift Current Broncos players
Texas Stars players